The Australia China Business Council (ACBC) was formed in 1973 shortly after the re-establishment of diplomatic ties between Australia and China.

The Australia China Business Council's primary focus is to promote two way investment and trade between Australia and China and is the leading business organization between the two countries. The Council undertakes various thought leadership activities and lobbying of stakeholders.

The presiding President of the Australia China Business Council is David Olsson. 

The Australia China Business Council, has representative offices in every state and territory in Australia. In China, the Australia China Business Council works with the Australia Chambers of Commerce to deliver services to its members.

Events 
The Australia China Business Council holds regular events around Australia and in China, including hosting of Chinese delegations to Australia, seminars, networking events and business seminars. ACBC has a number of notable annual events:
 Canberra Networking Day  
 Chinese New Year Celebrations

See also 
 China Council for the Promotion of International Trade
 Australia Trade and Investment Commission 
 Australia China Youth Association

References

External References
Official site

Business organisations based in Australia
Australia–China relations
Foreign trade of Australia